The Dawns Here Are Quiet is a 2015 Russian war drama directed by Renat Davletyarov.

Like the well-known 1972 picture, it is based on the 1969 novel by Boris Vasilyev.

Plot
Sergeant major Vaskov and five young antiaircraft gunwomen confront a group of experienced saboteurs, who are sent by the nazis into a detachment far from the front, which is of strategic importance. Vaskov and the women will have to prevent the diversion, but pay the highest price for it...

Cast
Pyotr Fyodorov — foreman Fedot Evgrafovich Vaskov, commandant of the crossing
Anastasia Mikulchina — junior sergeant Rita Osyanina, squad leader
Yevgenia Malakhova — Zhenya Komelkova
Agniya Kuznetsova — Sonya Gurvich
Sofia Lebedeva — Liza Brichkina
Kristina Asmus — Galya Chetvertak
Ekaterina Vilkova — senior sergeant Kiryanova 
Anatoliy Belyy — comrade "Third", major
Darya Moroz — Mary, the landlady of the foreman
Victor Proskurin — postman Makarych
Maksim Drozd — Alexei Luzhin, beloved Komelkova
Alexey Barabash — guest of the Brichkin
Olga Lomonosova — mother of the Fourteen
Ilya Alekseyev — lieutenant-border guard Osyanin, husband of Rita
Natalya Batrak — mother of Osyanina
Valeriy Grishko — father Brichkina
Yevgenia Ulyanova — mother of Brichkina
Sergey Vidineyev — father of Komelkova
Yulia Silayeva — mother of Komelkova
Alina Babak — Nadya, the younger sister of Zhenya Komelkova
Yelena Medvedeva — Vera Iosifovna, mother of Sonya Gurvich
Ilya Yermolov — son of Sonya Gurvich
Vasilisa Kucherenko — young Galya Chetvertak
Alesya Guzko — young Liza Brichkina
Yulia Polynskaya — the woman with underwear
Nadezhda Azorkina — Polina Yegorovna Yegorova
Maksim Dromashko — NKVD lieutenant
Yevgeniy Kostin — antiaircraft gunner
Yulia Kuykka — antiaircraft gunner
Archibald Archibaldovich (Artur Yenikeyev) — German saboteur
Nina Krachkovskaya
Sergei Garmash — the narrator

Television version
An extended version made out of four 45 minute episodes was released on Channel One Russia, on 9 May 2016.

References

External links
 
 The Dawns Here Are Quiet on YouTube (StarMedia)

Russian war drama films
2015 war drama films
2016 Russian television series debuts
2016 Russian television series endings
Russian television miniseries
Russian television films
Channel One Russia original programming
2015 drama films
2015 films
Russian World War II films
Films directed by Renat Davletyarov